Jiuquan Satellite Launch Center (JSLC;  also known as Shuangchengzi Missile Test Center; Launch Complex B2; formally Northwest Comprehensive Missile Testing Facility; Base 20; 63600 Unit) is a Chinese space vehicle launch facility (spaceport) located in the Gobi Desert, Inner Mongolia. It is part of the Dongfeng Aerospace City (Base 10). Although the facility is geographically located within Ejin Banner of Inner Mongolia's Alxa League, it is named after the nearest city, Jiuquan in Gansu Province.  The launch center straddles both sides of the Ruo Shui river.

History 

It was founded in 1958, the first of China's four spaceports. As with all Chinese launch facilities, it is remote and generally closed to foreigners.

The Satellite Launch Center is a part of Dongfeng Space City, also known as Base 10 or Dongfeng base.  The Dongfeng site  also includes People's Liberation Army Air Force (PLAAF) test flight facilities, a space museum and a so-called martyr's cemetery.

JSLC is usually used to launch vehicles into lower and medium orbits with large orbital inclination angles, as well as testing medium to long-range missiles. Its facilities are state of the art and provide support to every phase of a satellite launch campaign. The site includes the Technical Center, the Launch Complex, the Launch Control Center, the Mission Command and Control Center and various other logistical support systems.

The center covers 2800 km2 and may have housing for as many as 20,000 people. The facilities and launch support equipment were likely modelled on Soviet counterparts and the Soviet Union likely provided technical support to Jiuquan.

The launch center has been the focus of many of China's ventures into space, including their first satellite Dong Fang Hong I 
in 1970, and their first crewed space mission Shenzhou 5 on 15 October 2003.  As of 2021, all Chinese crewed space flights, meaning all flights in the Shenzhou program including crewed flights to the Tiangong space station, have launched from Jiuquan.

In August 2016, China launched the first quantum communication satellite, the "Quantum Experiments at Space Scale", from the center.

In August 2018, Chinese private rocket manufacturing startups i-Space and OneSpace launched sub-orbital rockets from the center. On July 25, 2019, the first Chinese private orbital launch took place from Jiuquan as I-Space launched their Hyperbola-1 rocket.

Launch pads
 Launch Area 2, 2 launch pads:
 LA-2A: CZ-1, DF-3, DF-5
 LA-2B: CZ-2A, CZ-2C, CZ-2D, FB-1

The launch pads at Launch Area 2 are located at approximately 41.308833° north, 100.316512° east (north pad) and 41.306143° north, 100.313229° east (south pad).

 Launch Area 3, 2 launch pads: DF-1, DF-2, R-2.
Launch Area 3 is approximately 2.7 km south of Launch Area 2. The launch pads are located at approximately 41.283190° north, 100.304706° east (north pad) and 41.280457° north, 100.304582° east (south pad).

 Launch Area 4 (South Launch Site), 2 launch pads, only active complex: 
 SLS-1: CZ-2F launcher with nearby Vertical Assembly Facility.
 SLS-2: CZ-2C, CZ-2D, CZ-4B, CZ-4C and CZ-11, operational since 2003
Launch Area 4 is approximately 37.9 km south of Launch Area 3. The launch pads are located at approximately 40.960671° north, 100.298186° east (north pad) and 40.957893° north, 100.290944° east (south pad).

See also

 Chinese space program
 Taiyuan Satellite Launch Center 
 Wenchang Satellite Launch Center
 Xichang Satellite Launch Center

References

External links 

 Base 20 Jiuquan Space Facility on GlobalSecurity.org

Buildings and structures in Alxa League
Chinese space program facilities
Spaceports in China
Infrastructure completed in 1958
1958 establishments in China
Jiuquan
Rocket launch sites